Nenad Pagonis (born 28 July 1987) is a Serbian cruiserweight  kickboxer  fighting out of Mike's Gym in Amsterdam, Netherlands and Team Pagonis in Novi Sad, Serbia. In 2010 he became W.A.K.O. Pro world champion (K-1 rules). He won a number of world and European titles at amateur level.

Biography and career
Pagonis is of Greek paternal descent.  In 2006, at the age of 19, he won a gold medal at the yearly Balkan Bames, and won gold at the W.A.K.O. European championships held in Macedonia.  From 2007 to 2009 he won two world championships, two world cups and a further Balkans championship.

In 2010 Pagonis became professional, and won the W.A.K.O Pro world title against reigning champion Antonio Sousa, winning by a third round stoppage victory in Milan Sousa was knocked down three times before the referee stopped the fight. Pagonis then joined Mike's Gym in the Netherlands where he trained with fighters including Badr Hari and Melvin Manhoef. Pagonis has now won a world title 8 times (4 amateur titles, 4 professional title) and has won 3 European titles.  Pagonis also appeared on It's Showtime in Athens in 2010, where he defeated Rustemi Kreshnik by decision, allowing him to challenge the reigning It's Showtime 95MAX champion Danyo Ilunga the following year.

A planned fight on December 9, 2012 under the newly formed Serbian "Supreme Fighting Championship" organisation did not take place after Pagonis was injured.

He lost to Artem Vakhitov by unanimous decision on the Glory 12: New York undercard in New York City on November 23, but that decision was questionable.

Beside his professional boxing career, he is the founder and the lead vocalist of the Serbian rock band Black Peacock (due to legal issues, the band changed its name to Black Peacock from Jurassic Rock, from his last name, which means peacock in Greek). Pagonis performs with the band manly covers of acclaimed songs by AC/DC, Deep Purple, Eagles and Judas Priest at various festivals around the Vojvodina region and Novi Sad, including the humanitarian Atina and Oktobar fest. Other than that, his music career includes the participation in the fourth season of the Serbian version of Your Face Sounds Familiar. In exact order, he imitated: Luis Fonsi (10th place), Axl Rose of Guns N' Roses (3rd place), Šaban Šaulić (3rd place), Jelena Karleuša (6th place), Marc Anthony (1st place), Harry Styles (8th place), Robbie Williams (8th place), Conchita Wurst (10th place), Lenny Kravitz (9th place), Đorđe Balašević (10th place) and Brian Johnson of AC/DC (2nd place). In the final, he claimed 8th place out of 10.

Titles

Professional
2014 W.A.K.O. Pro World Low Kick Rules Heavyweight champion -88.61 kg
2013 W.A.K.O. Pro cruiser heavyweight world champion -94.1 kg (Low Kick Rules)
2012 Wins WAKO Pro World Grand Prix 2011 championship (As member of Serbian national team)
2012 W.K.B.F. K-1 Rules International Super heavyweight Championship +95 kg
2010 W.A.K.O. Pro heavyweight world champion -88.6 kg (K-1 Rules)

Amateur
2015 W.A.K.O. World Championships in Belgrade, Serbia  −91 kg (K-1 rules)
2014 W.A.K.O. European Championships in Bilbao, Spain  −91 kg (Low-Kick rules)
2013 W.A.K.O. World Championships in Guaruja, Brasil  −91 kg (Low-Kick rules)
2012 W.A.K.O. European Championships in Ankara, Turkey  −91 kg (Low-Kick rules)
2011 W.A.K.O. World Championships in Skopje, Macedonia  -91 kg (K-1 Rules)
2010 Serbia Open Cup Champion -86 kg (K-1 Rules)
2009 W.A.K.O. World Championships in Villach, Austria  -86 kg (K-1 Rules)
2009 W.A.K.O. World Cup in Szeged, Hungary  -86 kg (K-1 Rules)
2008 W.A.K.O. European Championships in Oporto, Portugal  −86 kg (K-1 rules)
2008 W.A.K.O. Balkans Championships in Ohrid, Macedonia  -86 kg (K-1 Rules)
2008 W.A.K.O. World Cup in Szeged, Hungary  -86 kg (K-1 Rules)
2007 W.A.K.O. World Championships in Belgrade, Serbia  -81 kg (Low-Kick)
2007 W.A.K.O. World Cup in Szeged, Hungary  -81 kg (Low-Kick)
2006 W.A.K.O. European Championships in Skopje, Macedonia  -81 kg (Low-Kick)
2006 W.A.K.O. Balkans Championships in Burgas, Bulgaria  -81 kg (Low-Kick)

Boxing record

| style="text-align:center;" colspan="7"|8 Wins (6 knockouts, 2 decisions),  0 Losses, 0 Draws
|-  style="text-align:center; background:#e3e3e3;"
|  style="border-style:none none solid solid; "|Res.
|  style="border-style:none none solid solid; "|Record
|  style="border-style:none none solid solid; "|Opponent
|  style="border-style:none none solid solid; "|Type
|  style="border-style:none none solid solid; "|Rd., Time
|  style="border-style:none none solid solid; "|Date
|  style="border-style:none none solid solid; "|Location
|  style="border-style:none none solid solid; "|Notes
|- align=center
|Loss
| 8-1
|align=left| Nikola Milacic
|
|
| 
|align=left| Small hall SPENS Novi Sad
|align=left|
|- align=center
|Win
| 8-0
|align=left| Davit Gorgiladze
|
|
| 
|align=left| Boxhalle Marzahn Berlin
|align=left|
|- align=center
|Win
| 7-0
|align=left| Bjorn Blaschke
|
|
| 
|align=left|
|align=left|
|- align=center
|Win
| 6-0
|align=left| Muhammed Ali Durmaz
|
|
| 
|align=left|
|align=left|
|- align=center
|Win
| 5-0
|align=left| Giulian Ilie
|
|
| 
|align=left|
|align=left|
|- align=center
|Win
| 4-0
|align=left| Vladimir Reznicek
|
|
| 
|align=left|
|align=left|
|- align=center
|Win
| 3-0
|align=left| Ata Dogan
|
|
| 
|align=left|
|align=left|
|- align=center
|Win
| 2-0
|align=left| Robert Cervenak
|
|
| 
|align=left|
|align=left|
|- align=center
|Win
| 1-0
|align=left| George Ubah
|
|
| 
|align=left|
|align=left|
|- align=center

Kickboxing record

|- 
|-  bgcolor="#CCFFCC"
| 2014-12-18 || Win ||align=left| Agron Preteni  || SOUL Night of Champions  || Novi Sad, Serbia || Decision (Unanimous) || 5 || 3:00
|-
! style=background:white colspan=9 |
|-
|-  bgcolor="#FFBBBB"
| 2013-11-23 || Loss ||align=left| Artem Vakhitov || Glory 12: New York || New York City, New York, USA ||Decision (Unanimous) || 3 || 3:00
|-
|-  bgcolor="#FFBBBB"
| 2013-06-29 || Loss ||align=left| Alexei Papin  || Martial Arts Festival  || Moscow, Russia || TKO (injury) || 3 || 0:00
|-
! style=background:white colspan=9 |
|-
|-  bgcolor="#CCFFCC"
| 2013-03-09 || Win ||align=left| Alexei Papin  || Monte Carlo Fighting Masters || Monte Carlo, Monaco || Decision (Split) || 3 || 3:00
|-
! style=background:white colspan=9 |
|-
|-  bgcolor="#CCFFCC"
| 2012-06-16 || Win ||align=left| Kurban Omarov  || W.A.K.O. Pro GP Serbia vs Russia, final || Belgrade, Serbia || TKO (retirement) || 1 || 3:00
|-
! style=background:white colspan=9 |
|-
|-  bgcolor="#CCFFCC"
| 2012-05-18 || Win ||align=left| Nato Lauuii  || Fight Night Sydney || Sydney, Australia || KO || 2 || 
|-
! style=background:white colspan=9 |
|-
|-  bgcolor="#FFBBBB"
| 2011-06-11 || Loss ||align=left| Danyo Ilunga || BFN Group presents: It's Showtime Warsaw || Warsaw, Poland || TKO (referee stop) || 4 || 1:13
|-
! style=background:white colspan=9 |
|-
|-  bgcolor="#CCFFCC"
| 2011-03-05 || Win ||align=left| Thanasis Michaloudis || Wako-Pro World Grand Prix 2011: Serbia vs Greece, quarter final || Belgrade, Serbia || KO (punches) || 1 || 1:16 
|-
|-  bgcolor="#CCFFCC"
| 2010-12-11 || Win ||align=left| Rustemi Kreshnik || It's Showtime Athens || Athens, Greece || Decision (Unanimous) || 3 || 3:00 
|-
|-  bgcolor="#CCFFCC"
| 2010-03-20 || Win ||align=left| Antonio Sousa || Kickboxing Superstar XIX || Milan, Italy || TKO (ref stop/3 knockdowns) || 3 ||
|-
! style=background:white colspan=9 |
|-  bgcolor="#CCFFCC"
| 2009-01-21 || Win ||align=left| Atef Cherif || FFC 2 || Casablanca, Morocco || Decision (unanimous) || 5 || 2:00 
|-
|-  bgcolor="#CCFFCC"
| 2007-01-26 || Win ||align=left| Krasimir Dimov || Zlatni Kikbokser || Belgrade, Serbia || Decision (Unanimous) || 3 || 3:00
|-

|-
|-  bgcolor="#CCFFCC"
| 2015-10 || Win ||align=left| Piotr Ramankevich || W.A.K.O World Championships 2015, K-1 Final -91 kg || Belgrade, Serbia || Decision (Unanimous) || 3 || 2:00
|-
! style=background:white colspan=9 | 
|-
|-  bgcolor="#CCFFCC"
| 2015-10 || Win ||align=left| Marat Mirzabolaev || W.A.K.O World Championships 2015, K-1 Semi Finals -91 kg || Belgrade, Serbia || Decision (Unanimous) || 3 || 2:00
|-
|-  bgcolor="#CCFFCC"
| 2015-10 || Win ||align=left| Anar Mammadov || W.A.K.O World Championships 2015, K-1 Quarter Finals -91 kg || Belgrade, Serbia || Decision (Unanimous) || 3 || 2:00
|-
|-  bgcolor="#FFBBBB"
| 2014-10-24 || Loss ||align=left| Basir Abakarov || W.A.K.O European Championships 2014, Low-Kick Final -91 kg  || Bilbao, Spain || Decision (Unanimous) || 3 || 2:00
|-
! style=background:white colspan=9 | 
|-
|-  bgcolor="#CCFFCC"
| 2014-10-23 || Win ||align=left| Edgar Sarkisian || W.A.K.O European Championships 2014, Low-Kick Semi Finals -91 kg   || Bilbao, Spain || Decision (Unanimous) || 3 || 2:00
|-
|-  bgcolor="#CCFFCC"
| 2013-10-04 || Win ||align=left| Agron Preteni || W.A.K.O World Championships 2013, Low-Kick Final -91 kg || Guaruja, Brasil || Decision (Unanimous) || 3 || 2:00
|-
! style=background:white colspan=9 |
|-
|-  bgcolor="#CCFFCC"
| 2013-10-03 || Win ||align=left| Igor Darmeshkin || W.A.K.O World Championships 2013, Low-Kick Semi Finals -91 kg || Guaruja, Brasil ||  ||  ||
|-  bgcolor="#CCFFCC"
| 2013-10-03 || Win ||align=left| Ferit Karan || W.A.K.O World Championships 2013, Low-Kick Quarter Finals -91 kg || Guaruja, Brasil ||  ||  ||
|-  bgcolor="#CCFFCC"
| 2012-11-02 || Win ||align=left| Agron Preteni || W.A.K.O European Championships 2012, Low-Kick Final -91 kg || Ankara, Turkey || Decision (Unanimous) || 3 || 2:00
|-
! style=background:white colspan=9 |
|-
|-  bgcolor="#CCFFCC"
| 2012-11-01 || Win ||align=left| Edgar Sarkisian || W.A.K.O European Championships 2012, Low-Kick Semi Finals -91 kg || Ankara, Turkey || Decision (unanimous) || 3 || 2:00
|-  bgcolor="#CCFFCC"
| 2011-11 || Win ||align=left| Bahrudin Mahmić || W.A.K.O World Championships 2011, K-1 Final -91 kg || Skopje, Macedonia || Decision (Unanimous) || 3 || 2:00
|-
! style=background:white colspan=9 |
|-
|-  bgcolor="#CCFFCC"
| 2011-10 || Win ||align=left| Vladimir Mineev || W.A.K.O World Championships 2011, K-1 Semi Finals -91 kg || Skopje, Macedonia || Decision (Unanimous) || 3 || 2:00
|-  bgcolor="#CCFFCC"
| 2011-10 || Win ||align=left| Mihal Hromek || W.A.K.O World Championships 2011, K-1 Quarter Finals -91 kg || Skopje, Macedonia || Decision (Unanimous) || 3 || 2:00
|-  bgcolor="#CCFFCC"
| 2011-10 || Win ||align=left| Luis Morais || W.A.K.O World Championships 2011, K-1 1st Round -91 kg || Skopje, Macedonia || Decision (Unanimous) || 3 || 2:00
|-  bgcolor="#FFBBBB"
| 2010-10-18 || Loss ||align=left| Zamig Athakishiyev || W.A.K.O European Championships 2010, Low-Kick Quarter Finals -81 kg || Baku, Azerbaijan || KO || 3 || 
|-
|-  bgcolor="#CCFFCC"
| 2010-01-31 || Win ||align=left| Marko Milinković || Serbia Open Cup 2010, Final || Belgrade, Serbia || Decision (Unanimous) || 3 || 2:00
|-
! style=background:white colspan=9 |
|-
|-  bgcolor="#CCFFCC"
| 2009-10-26 || Win ||align=left| Dzianis Hancharonak || W.A.K.O World Championships 2009, K-1 Final -86 kg || Villach, Austria ||  ||  || 
|-
! style=background:white colspan=9 |
|-
|-  bgcolor="#CCFFCC"
| 2009-10-24 || Win ||align=left| Evgeny Ganin || W.A.K.O World Championships 2009, K-1 Semi Finals -86 kg || Villach, Austria ||  ||  || 
|-
|-  bgcolor="#CCFFC"
| 2008-11 || Winn ||align=left| Dzianis Hancharonak || W.A.K.O European Championships 2008, K-1 Final -86 kg  || Porto, Portugal || Decision (Unanimous) || 3 || 2:00
|-
! style=background:white colspan=9 |
|-
|-  bgcolor="#CCFFCC"
| 2008-11 || Win ||align=left| Evgeniy Ganin || W.A.K.O European Championships 2008, K-1 Semi Finals -86 kg  || Porto, Portugal || Decision (Unanimous) || 3 || 2:00
|-
|-  bgcolor="#CCFFCC"
| 2007-09-30 || Win ||align=left| Rail Rajabov || W.A.K.O World Championships 2007, Low-Kick Final -81 kg || Belgrade, Serbia || Decision (Split) || 3 || 2:00
|-
! style=background:white colspan=9 |
|-
|-  bgcolor="#CCFFCC"
| 2007-09-? || Win ||align=left| Viktor Nordh || W.A.K.O World Championships 2007, Low-Kick Semi Final -81 kg || Belgrade, Serbia || KO || ||
|-
|-  bgcolor="#CCFFCC"
| 2007-09-? || Win ||align=left| Anatoliy Dyakov || W.A.K.O World Championships 2007, Low-Kick Quarter Finals -81 kg || Belgrade, Serbia || Decision (Unanimous) || 3 || 2:00
|-
|-  bgcolor="#CCFFCC"
| 2007-09-? || Win ||align=left| Ilijan Kostadinov || W.A.K.O World Championships 2007, Low-Kick 1st Round -81 kg || Belgrade, Serbia || Decision (Unanimous) || 3 || 2:00
|-
|-  bgcolor="#CCFFCC"
| 2006-11-26 || Win ||align=left| Ninic Drazenko || W.A.K.O European Championships 2006, Low-Kick Final -81 kg || Skopje, Macedonia || Decision (Split) || 3 || 2:00
|-
! style=background:white colspan=9 |
|-
|-  bgcolor="#CCFFCC"
| 2006-11-25 || Win ||align=left| Teppo Laine || W.A.K.O European Championships 2006, Low-Kick Semi Final -81 kg || Skopje, Macedonia || Decision (Split) || 3 || 2:00
|-
|-  bgcolor="#CCFFCC"
| 2006-11-24 || Win ||align=left| Aliaksandr Kryvarotau || W.A.K.O European Championships 2006, Low-Kick Quarter Finals -81 kg || Skopje, Macedonia || Decision (Split) || 3 || 2:00
|-
|-  bgcolor="#CCFFCC"
| 2006-11-23 || Win ||align=left| Leonildo Domingos || W.A.K.O European Championships 2006, Low-Kick 2nd Round -81 kg || Skopje, Macedonia || KO || || 
|-
|-
| colspan=9 | Legend:

See also 
List of It's Showtime events
List of It's Showtime champions
List of WAKO Amateur World Championships
List of WAKO Amateur European Championships
List of male kickboxers

References

External links

 Kick Boxing Šampion Nenad Pagonis - Official Website

1987 births
Living people
Serbian male kickboxers
Serbian Muay Thai practitioners
Serbian people of Greek descent
Heavyweight kickboxers
Cruiserweight kickboxers
Light heavyweight kickboxers
Serbian musicians
Serbian tenors